Moshe Zvi Giterman of Savran (1775–1837) was the first Rebbe of Savran (Hasidic dynasty) and an influential Hasidic leader in western Ukraine, whose following numbered in the thousands.

His father, Rabbi Shimon Shlomo (I), was the Maggid of Savran and a disciple of Dovber of Mezeritch, the primary disciple of the Baal Shem Tov, founder of Hasidic Judaism. Moshe Zvi was a disciple of his father, and also of Rabbi Levi Yitschok of Berditchev and Rabbi Boruch of Mezhbizh. After his father's death in 1802, Moshe Zvi took over his position as the Maggid of Savran. Moshe Zvi went on to become the Rabbi of Berditchev after the death of Rabbi Levi Yitzchok of Berditchev, and later became the Rabbi of the towns of Uman and Kishinev as well. He had thousands of chasidim in Volhynia and Bessarabia.

Moshe Zvi's Torah insights were collected and printed in the book, Likutey Shoshanim. His son, Shimon Shlomo (II), succeeded him as Savraner Rebbe.

Nigun (Hasidic Melodies)
Among other hasidic melodies specific to Savran, Rebbe Moshe Zvi Giterman composed a very inspiring version of B'nei heicholo that is traditionally sung at Seudah Shlishit.

Hasidic rebbes
Hasidic rabbis in Europe
Ukrainian Orthodox rabbis
1775 births
1837 deaths